Gravely may refer to:

 Gravely Tractor, a manufacturer of outdoor power lawn and garden implements
 USS Gravely (DDG-107), an Arleigh Burke-class guided missile destroyer

People with the surname Gravely:

Etta C. Gravely (born 1939), American chemistry academic
Frederic Henry Gravely (1885–1965), English entomologist
 Joseph J. Gravely (1828–1872), American politician
 Samuel L. Gravely, Jr. (1922–2004), African American Navy pioneer
 Tracy Gravely (born 1968), Canadian footballer

See also
 Graveley (disambiguation)